Supermum (Chinese: 媽媽好) is a 2019 Malaysian Mandarin-language family drama film. The film follows as the adult siblings reunites when their old mother falls down, but they soon begins feuding one another for financial problems.

It is a tribute and dedication to the late veteran actress Lai Meng. It is released on 30 May 2019 in Malaysia.

Synopsis
The film begins with the elderly mother who falls down due to an accident. Her hospitalization brings her children and their families together, but the siblings soon begin feuding one another on financial issues. While some are pressured because of their condition, others just hope to live a simpler life. They choose to hurt each another and ignore the importance of being a family.

Cast
 Eliza Wong, as mother
 Remon Lim, as eldest daughter
 Tan Kiong Ann, as eldest son
 Wei Wei, as second daughter
 Sam Loo, as youngest son
 Rabbit Chen, as eldest son-in-law
 Manne Chen, as eldest daughter-in-law
 Sarah Tan Qin Lin, as granddaughter, from eldest daughter
 Joey Leong, as granddaughter, from eldest son
 Jaden Ng Eu-gene, as grandson, from second daughter
 John Tan
 Sanchia Chiu
 Tan Hao Yen
 Smyth Wong
 Tony Ngu

Production
Filming took place in Cameron Highlands and Kuala Lumpur from June to August 2018. Most of the crew, including director Bjarne Wong, are from Sarawak. It was the final project and a tribute to the late Malaysian veteran actress Lai Meng, who had contributed to the local Chinese-language film industry.

References

External links 
 Supermum on Cinema.com.my

Malaysian drama films
Films directed by Bjarne Wong
2019 drama films